Luiz Fernando Guimarães (born November 28, 1949 in Rio de Janeiro, Brazil) is a Brazilian actor.

At the beginning of the 1980s, he participated in the Asdrubal Trouxe o Trombone, a group of actors from Rio de Janeiro who wrote, produced, and performed their plays. Regina Casé, Evandro Mesquita, Patrícia Travassos, among others, were his mates at Asdrubal. Luiz Fernando and the Asdrubal were very popular and successful.

During the 2000's he became famous country wide performing TV ads to a government bank. He is famous for his role in Os Normais.

References

Brazilian male stage actors
1949 births
Living people
Brazilian people of Portuguese descent
Brazilian male television actors
Brazilian gay actors